Zvartnots may refer to:
 Zvartnots Cathedral, a 7th century Armenian church
 Zvartnots International Airport in Yerevan, Armenia
 Zvartnots, Armenia, a town
 Zvartnots-AAL F.C., a defunct Armenian football club based in Yerevan, Armenia